Marked for Death is a 1990 American action film directed by Dwight H. Little. The film stars Steven Seagal as John Hatcher, a former DEA troubleshooter who returns to his Illinois hometown to find it taken over by a posse of vicious Jamaican drug dealers led by Screwface. Using a combination of fear and Obeah, a Jamaican syncretic religion of West African and Caribbean origin similar to Haitian vodou and Santería, Screwface rules the drug trade in Lincoln Heights.

Plot

Drug Enforcement Administration (DEA) agent and decorated soldier John Hatcher returns from Colombia, where drug dealers killed his partner Chico, and John killed the dealers. As a result of Chico's death and years of dead-end work, Hatcher retires and heads to his hometown of Lincoln Heights, in suburban Chicago. He visits his family, as well as the local high school to meet old friend and former U.S. Army buddy Max Keller who works there as a football coach and physical education teacher.

As John and Max celebrate their reunion at a club, a gunfight breaks out between local drug dealers and a Jamaican gang at the venue. The gang, an unnamed Jamaican Posse, is led by a notorious drug lord named Screwface. John arrests one of Screwface's henchmen as the gunfight ends.

News of Posse crimes occurring in Chicago and across the United States spread as the Posse expands its operations and recruits more members. The next day, Screwface sends his henchmen to do a drive-by shooting on the house where John, his sister Melissa, and Melissa's 12-year-old daughter Tracey live. Tracey is injured and hospitalized in critical condition.

In the subsequent investigation, John encounters a gangster named Jimmy Fingers, whom he is forced to kill. A Jamaican gangster named Nesta arrives and is subdued by John, who asks about Screwface. Nesta tells him to go after Screwface alone and jumps out the window to his death. The next day, John discovers a strange symbol engraved on a carpet, and with the help of Jamaican voodoo and gang expert Leslie Davalos, a detective for the Chicago Police Department, learns that it is an African black magic ideogram symbolizing blood that is used to mark their crimes. John decides to come out of retirement to join Max in a battle against Screwface.

John gets a phone call from Melissa, which is cut short when Screwface and his men invade the Hatcher household. They leave upon John's arrival, and Melissa is unharmed. The next day, John and Max encounter another batch of Screwface's henchmen, resulting in a car chase. The chase ends in a high-end jewelry store, wherein two henchmen are wounded and one is killed by John amidst the chaos of fleeing shoppers.

Later, during a meeting with Leslie, she informs John that the only way to stop the Jamaican Posse is to bring down Screwface. That evening, Screwface ambushes John under the guise of a construction crew; he plants a Molotov cocktail in John's car. John barely escapes before the car explodes.

John and Max then team up with Charles, a Jamaican-born detective of the Chicago police who has been trailing Screwface for five years. They acquire weaponry from a local arms dealer, then, after modifying and testing their equipment, they head for Kingston, Jamaica. Upon arrival, Max and Charles ask people in the streets for information about Screwface. A Jamaican local presents them a photo of a woman who was formerly acquainted with Screwface and informs them of a nightclub that she visits regularly. John meets the woman in the nightclub, where she provides him details of Screwface such as her frequent hangouts with him, his drug business, and the address of his mansion, as well as the death of her sister by Screwface's hands. The woman also tells John a cryptic clue: the secret of Screwface's power is that he has two heads and four eyes.

By nightfall, John, Max, and Charles head for Screwface's mansion. Infiltrating the premises through a nearby plantation, John eliminates three henchmen on the estate's balcony with his silenced sniper rifle, plants a bomb at a nearby power station, and enters the inner grounds. While Max and Charles keep a lookout and observe the party in progress, John detonates the bomb, causing the party to erupt into chaos. With Max and Charles opening fire on the Posse gang, John enters the building and disposes of many henchmen. He makes his way to a sacrificial area, but gets captured by Screwface and his remaining henchmen. John breaks free and kills or wounds the henchmen before decapitating Screwface with his own sword.

Upon returning to Chicago, the trio display Screwface's severed head to the Chicago Posse to try to convince them to end their crimes and leave town. However, Charles is suddenly impaled by Screwface's twin brother, making the gang believe that Screwface has returned from the dead using voodoo. A gunfight breaks out wherein Max holds off the henchmen despite being shot in the leg while John dispatches more gang members before he engages Screwface's twin in a sword fight. The fight moves upstairs to a nightclub owned by the twin. After a lengthy fight, John finally gets the upper-hand on the twin. He gouges his eyes out and breaks his spine before dropping him down an elevator shaft, impaling him in the process. As the surviving Posse members discover their boss' corpse, their fates remain ambiguous, although the death of the Screwface twins implies their arrest by law enforcement.

John carries Charles' body with Max limping next to him as they walk off into the early morning.

Cast

 Steven Seagal as DEA Agent John Hatcher
 Keith David as Max Keller
 Joanna Pacuła as Professor Leslie Davalos
 Basil Wallace as "Screwface"
Wallace also portrays Screwface's twin brother
 Tom Wright as Detective Charles Marks
 Kevin Dunn as FBI Agent Sal Roselli
 Elizabeth Gracen as Melissa Hatcher
 Bette Ford as Kate Hatcher
 Danielle Harris as Tracey Hatcher
 Al Israel as Tito Barco
 Richard Delmonte as DEA Agent Chico
 Arlen Dean Snyder as DEA Agent Duvall
 Victor Romero Evans as Nesta
 Michael Ralph as "Monkey"
 Danny Trejo as Hector
 Tom Dugan as Paco
 Gary Carlos Cervantes as Richard "Little Richard"
 Joe Renteria as Raoul
 Jeffrey Anderson-Gunter as "Nago"
 Peter Jason as DEA Assistant Director Pete Stone
 Stanley White as Sheriff O'Dwyer
 Earl Boen as Dr. Stein
 Rita Verreos as Marta, Voodoo Priestess
 Tracey Burch as Sexy Girl #1
 Teri Weigel as Sexy Girl #2
 Jimmy Cliff as himself

Production 
Steven Seagal had wanted to hire director Dwight Little for his second feature, Hard to Kill, but studio Warner Bros. vetoed his choice, and went with Bruce Malmuth instead. According to Little, Seagal had the option in his contract with Warner to do one film with another studio. Seagal chose to exercise that option and make his third film at 20th Century Fox, where he demanded  that they hire Little for Marked for Death. "I got that job only because Steven insisted," said Little. During production, the studio was pushing for more humor in the film, but Little and Seagal had made a pact to resist these attempts. Their template for the film was The French Connection.

On the third day of shooting Marked for Death, Hard to Kill came out in theaters. Dwight Little: "It opened huge, and it stayed on top for a while. No one, including Steven, thought that was going to be success. But it was. Frankly, just based on his charisma and a couple of good action scenes. I was downtown shooting a scene for Marked for Death when suddenly I see all these limos and towncars coming to the set. They were all CAA-agents and producers, coming out of the woodwork to see the next big action guy. They all wanted to talk to him."

Of Seagal's martial arts, Little said: "Steven is the only guy who does what he does in the movies, where you let your opponent's energy go past you. In that respect, he's totally unique. But it's not a forward, high kicking, punching thing. That's why I felt I needed action movie stuff, like car chases, gun fights, explosions and some old fashioned cop stuff. Because if we tried to string together a bunch of Steven's fights, they will quickly start to feel the same."

Music

A soundtrack containing hip hop, reggae, and R&B music was released on September 27, 1990 by Delicious Vinyl.

Reception

Box office
Marked for Death opened at number one at the U.S. box office with an opening weekend gross of $11,790,047, making it Seagal's second straight film to open #1. It remained at #1 for 3 weekends. It earned a little more than $46 million domestically and $58 million worldwide.

Critical response
Rotten Tomatoes, a review aggregator, reports that 27% of 11 surveyed critics gave the film a positive review; the average rating is 4/10.  Audiences polled by CinemaScore gave the film an average grade of "A" on an A+ to F scale.  Both The New York Times and The Washington Post gave it a thumbs up, writing that it was another solid Seagal action film. In a less than favorable response from Entertainment Weekly, they wrote that the film is partially "undone by murky cinematography". The Chicago Tribune was very critical of the film.

References

External links
 
 

1990 films
1990 action films
1990 martial arts films
1990s English-language films
American action films
American martial arts films
American buddy cop films
Fictional portrayals of the Chicago Police Department
Films about the Drug Enforcement Administration
Films about drugs
American films about revenge
20th Century Fox films
Films scored by James Newton Howard
Films directed by Dwight H. Little
Films shot in Colombia
Films shot in Chicago
Films shot in Jamaica
Films shot in Los Angeles
Films with screenplays by Michael Grais
Films with screenplays by Mark Victor
1990s American films